"The Music Man" (Roud 17774) is a popular cumulative folksong among children, rugby players, and Hash House Harriers.

History 
Peter Kennedy published a song called "The German Musicianer" in "Folk Songs of Britain and Northern Ireland" (1975). It has some similarities with this song. Even earlier, "The Wonderful Musician", written by Walter Greenaway, was published in 1871. The chorus begins: "A big drum, a kettle drum, the fiddle, flute, and piccolo, piano, harp, harmonium and many more beside". The song is also known in Germany as "Ich bin ein Musikante" and adapted in the US to "I Am a Fine Musician."

For each verse the participants act out different instruments with specific actions.  Some of the actions for the adult version can be rude or crude. They may also attempt to imitate the sound of each instrument. It is sometimes performed in cabaret with the audience challenging the artistes to ever more extravagant - and difficult - renditions of, for example, the flugelhorn.

Stephen Hayward, the original Music Man, performs this song doing a tremendous 17 hour version for which he won the world record for longest song in 1997, including instruments in this rendition including the Timpani, The Fluba, The Theramin and The Cross Grainger Kangaroo Pouch Tone Tool, without repeating a single instrument in this extravagant 1432 instrument long version of the song.

Commercial recordings 
The song was recorded by Black Lace, a British pop group from Ossett in West Yorkshire, in 1989 and reached #52 in the UK singles charts.

Song structure and lyrics 
Each verse begins with the following chorus lines, divided between the lead singer ("The Music Man") and the audience. There are variations which follow roughly the same tune:
The Music Man: "I am the music man, And I come from down your way  and I can play!"
Audience: "What can you play?"

Each verse features a specific instrument with accompanying actions. After each verse, singers sing the previous verses in reverse order before singing the main chorus lines again.

Children's Mega Sing Along Party - I Am The Music Man 
Heigh-Ho 
Hawaii Five-O Theme 
I Shall Not Be Moved

See also
 Vi äro musikanter

References

External links 
 The German Musicianer

Drinking songs
Black Lace (band) songs
Year of song unknown
Songwriter unknown